John Paul Quinn  (26 February 191912 September 1961) was an Australian public servant and diplomat.

His early career included stints serving in Singapore, The Hague, London and in South Africa, where he served as Acting High Commissioner for a time between 1951 and 1952. Quinn was named Australia's first Minister to the associated States of Indo-China in 1952.

In April 1961, Quinn was appointed Australia's first Ambassador to the United Arab Republic.

On 12 September 1961, Quinn died while in office as Australian Minister to Cairo, he had been a passenger on Air France Flight 2005 when it crashed.

References

1919 births
1961 deaths
Australian Officers of the Order of the British Empire
Australian expatriates in Singapore
Australian expatriates in the Netherlands
Ambassadors of Australia to Egypt
Ambassadors of Australia to Vietnam
Australian expatriates in South Africa
Victims of aviation accidents or incidents in Morocco